Southern Village is a  New Urbanism neighborhood located in Chapel Hill, North Carolina. Southern Village was the top selling neighborhood in the Triangle market from 1999 to 2001. Nationally recognized as an example of smart growth, Southern Village has been featured in numerous publications including TIME, Better Homes & Gardens, and Builder magazines.

Andres Duany is known as the founder of New Urbanism; his projects have been built all over the country and the world; his flagship development, Seaside, Florida, served as the too-quaint-to be-real set for The Truman Show. Duany and Zyberk actually came to Chapel Hill and spoke to the Town Council about the future of New Urbanism here, and their oration had a profound effect on D.R. Bryan. Bryan even took a trip to Pienza, Italy, to understand his concepts by visiting the source of them. He came back with his own vision, one he had the means to fulfill: Bryan became the architect and developer of Southern Village.

Business District
Hyatt Place, a limited-service hotel brand that caters to business travelers, which is owned by Hyatt Hotels, is coming to Southern Village early 2017. Bryan Properties has partnered with Beacon ING of Charlotte as its development partner in the project.“We are looking at it as the third anchor for the Village Center,” Developer DR Bryan says, adding to the village's commercial options that include the Weaver Street Market co-op grocery store and the Lumina Theater movie cinema.

Education

The neighborhood is home to Mary Scroggs Elementary School and in walking distance to Culbreth Middle School which are a part of the Chapel Hill-Carrboro City Schools. Additionally, Carrboro High School, one of the top high schools in the state, is less than two miles away.

Recreation

The Lumina Theatre in Southern Village shows films year-round, but during the warmer months, moviegoers can bring their own chairs and blankets and catch family-friendly flicks outdoors on the Village Green. There are also free concerts on the Green on Sundays at 6pm.

The community is served by the southern, and only completed end, of the Fan Branch Trail, commonly called by local residents, the greenway. This trail forms part of a bike trail system planned for the Chapel Hill area. The Southern Community Park, which abuts the Village offers soccer fields and a dog-walking park, a playground and cookout area, and a roller hockey rink, as well as an extension of the Fan Branch Trail.

Culture
The North Carolina Symphony visits once a year to give a free outdoor concert on the Village Green. Pop pieces from films such as Mission Impossible, Star Wars and Superman are often featured, along with such favorites as Turkey in the Straw and the William Tell Overture. Furthermore, there are often festivals in the central area and during the summer (weather permitting) there are outdoor movies.

Transportation
The village is served by Chapel Hill Transit, connecting the community Park and Ride lot with downtown Chapel Hill, and with the nearby University of North Carolina at Chapel Hill. Service is provided during full-service periods, Monday through Friday only, with a special "Safe Ride" late night service Thursday, Friday and Saturday nights.

References

New Urbanism communities
Chapel Hill-Carrboro, North Carolina
Populated places established in 1994
1994 establishments in North Carolina